Ester Cosani Sologuren (24 December 1914 – March 2001) was a Chilean writer and illustrator. Using the nickname Rita Cosani, she became known as one of the leaders of early children's literature in Chile through her works which were published in the late 1930s and early 1940s.

Career
Cosani's work as a cartoonist began for the magazine El Colegial. In 1951 she was awarded the Director's Prize of the National Theater for her work La casa de las ratas. She also narrated a children's radio program named La cajita de música.

Works
 Leyenda de la quena (1938)
 Leyendas de la vieja casa (1938)
 Para saber y contar (1939)
 Las desventuras de Andrajo (1942)
 Cuentos a Pelusa (1943)
 La casa de las ratas (1943)
 Cuentos a Beatriz (1957)
 Una historia de ángeles (1957)
 Rimas (1994)
 Cuentos de Tocorí de la Sierra (1995)

References

1914 births
2001 deaths
20th-century Chilean women artists
20th-century Chilean women writers
Chilean cartoonists
Chilean women cartoonists
Chilean illustrators
Chilean women illustrators
Chilean children's book illustrators
Chilean people of Basque descent
Chilean people of Italian descent
People from Arica